Armand Solie (born 28 April 1944) is a Belgian field hockey player. He competed at the 1968 Summer Olympics, the 1972 Summer Olympics and the 1976 Summer Olympics.

References

External links
 

1944 births
Living people
Belgian male field hockey players
Olympic field hockey players of Belgium
Field hockey players at the 1968 Summer Olympics
Field hockey players at the 1972 Summer Olympics
Field hockey players at the 1976 Summer Olympics
Sportspeople from Ghent